Datebritishguys.com is a niche online dating service where American applicants seek to date British men. Which has been covered on Good Morning America and in The New York Times.

References

External links

Internet properties established in 2010
Online dating services of the United Kingdom